Birmingham Edgbaston is a constituency, represented in the House of Commons of the UK Parliament since 2017 by Preet Gill, a Labour Co-op MP.

The most high-profile MP for the constituency was former Prime Minister Neville Chamberlain (1937–1940).  Since 1953 it has elected a succession of female MPs.

Members of Parliament

Boundaries

2018–present: The City of Birmingham wards of Bartley Green, Edgbaston, Harborne, and Quinton, part of North Edgbaston and fragments of Weoley & Selly Oak and Balsall Heath West.

1997–2018: The City of Birmingham wards of Bartley Green, Edgbaston, Harborne, and Quinton.

1983–1997: The City of Birmingham wards of Edgbaston, Harborne, and Quinton.

1974–1983: The County Borough of Birmingham wards of Deritend, Edgbaston, Harborne, and Quinton.

1918–1974: The County Borough of Birmingham wards of Edgbaston, Harborne, and Market Hall.

1885–1918: The Municipal Borough of Birmingham ward of Edgbaston, part of Rotton Park ward, the local government district of Harborne, and part of the local government district of Balsall Heath.

South west of Birmingham city centre, this is a house and garden-rich and mostly middle-income constituency with limited social housing, featuring parks, Warwickshire's cricket ground and two grammar schools. It was a safe Conservative seat for decades, emphasised by solid Tory areas like Edgbaston itself and Bartley Green, but some areas, such as the more Labour-inclined Quinton and Harborne, have pockets of considerable deprivation and of low incomes, helping Labour hold the seat since 1997. It contains the University of Birmingham's main campus, and most of the student halls.

History
The political division elected Conservative candidates as its MP between a by-election in 1898 and the 1992 general elections inclusive. The election of Gisela Stuart in 1997 produced a 10% majority fractionally exceeded in percentage terms by her re-election in 2001 on a lower turnout, stretching her majority to 12.1%. The 2015 re-election of Stuart gave the seat the thirtieth-smallest majority of Labour's 232 seats by percentage of majority and represented an improvement on 2010.

On election night in May 1997, Birmingham Edgbaston was the ninth constituency to declare its results and the first seat to be gained by the Labour Party from the Conservatives on a 10% swing, after 99 years of Conservative representation; presaging the Labour landslide victory of that election. Labour have held the seat ever since. Birmingham Edgbaston has returned only female MPs since 1953, longer than any other constituency in the UK.  The current MP for the constituency is Preet Gill of the Labour Party, who is the first-ever female Sikh MP in the UK. She was first elected at the 2017 general election, after long-serving Labour MP Gisela Stuart stood down. It has been classified as a marginal seat; although in 2017 and 2019, the Labour Party won more than 50% of the vote.

Turnout has ranged from 78.8% in 1950 to 48% in 1918, and was recorded as 61.5% in 2019.

Elections

Elections in the 2010s

Elections in the 2000s

Elections in the 1990s

Elections in the 1980s

Elections in the 1970s

Elections in the 1960s

Elections in the 1950s

Elections in the 1940s

Elections in the 1930s

Elections in the 1920s

Elections in the 1910s

Elections in the 1900s

Elections in the 1890s

Elections in the 1880s

See also
List of parliamentary constituencies in the West Midlands (county)

Notes

References

Sources
 British Parliamentary Election Results 1885–1918, compiled and edited by F.W.S. Craig (Macmillan Press 1974)
 Debrett’s Illustrated Heraldic and Biographical House of Commons and the Judicial Bench 1886
 Debrett’s House of Commons and the Judicial Bench 1901
 Debrett’s House of Commons and the Judicial Bench 1918

External links 
 Birmingham city council constituency page

Parliamentary constituencies in Birmingham, West Midlands
Constituencies of the Parliament of the United Kingdom established in 1885
Constituencies of the Parliament of the United Kingdom represented by a sitting Prime Minister
Edgbaston